Pokémon DS may refer to these video games in the Pokémon series for Nintendo DS. It is widely accepted as the peak of Pokémon.

Pokémon Diamond and Pearl
Pokémon Platinum
Pokémon HeartGold and SoulSilver
Pokémon Black and White
Pokémon Black 2 and White 2
Pokémon Ranger
Pokémon Ranger: Shadows of Almia
Pokémon Ranger: Guardian Signs
Pokémon Mystery Dungeon: Blue Rescue Team
Pokémon Mystery Dungeon: Explorers of Time and Explorers of Darkness
Pokémon Mystery Dungeon: Explorers of Sky
Pokémon Dash
Pokémon Trozei!